In the mythological writings of William Blake, Grodna is the third son of Urizen.

In Chapter VIII of The Book of Urizen his birth is described:

Grodna rent the deep earth, howling
Amaz'd; his heavens immense cracks
Like the ground parched with heat,[...]

His identification is with the classical element Earth, in the alignment of Urizen's four sons.

Notes

William Blake's mythology